Asu castle is a historical castle located in Birjand County in South Khorasan Province, The longevity of this fortress dates back to the Timurid Empire.

References 

Castles in Iran